Rolling is a type of motion that combines rotation (commonly, of an axially symmetric object) and translation of that object with respect to a surface (either one or the other moves), such that, if ideal conditions exist, the two are in contact with each other without sliding.

Rolling where there is no sliding is referred to as pure rolling. By definition, there is no sliding when there is a frame of reference in which all points of contact on the rolling object have the same velocity as their counterparts on the surface on which the object rolls; in particular, for a frame of reference in which the rolling plane is at rest (see animation), the instantaneous velocity of all the points of contact (e.g., a generating line segment of a cylinder) of the rolling object is zero.

In practice, due to small deformations near the contact area, some sliding and energy dissipation occurs. Nevertheless, the resulting rolling resistance is much lower than sliding friction, and thus, rolling objects, typically require much less energy to be moved than sliding ones. As a result, such objects will more easily move, if they experience a force with a component along the surface, for instance gravity on a tilted surface, wind, pushing, pulling, or torque from an engine. Unlike cylindrical axially symmetric objects, the rolling motion of a cone is such that while rolling on a flat surface, its center of gravity performs a circular motion, rather than a linear motion. Rolling objects are not necessarily axially-symmetrical. Two well known non-axially-symmetrical rollers are the Reuleaux triangle and the Meissner bodies.  The oloid and the sphericon are members of a special family of developable rollers that develop their entire surface when rolling down a flat plane. Objects with corners, such as dice, roll by successive rotations about the edge or corner which is in contact with the surface. The construction of a specific surface allows even a perfect square wheel to roll with its centroid at constant height above a reference plane.

Applications 

Most land vehicles use wheels and therefore rolling for displacement. Slip should be kept to a minimum (approximating pure rolling), otherwise loss of control and an accident may result. This may happen when the road is covered in snow, sand, or oil, when taking a turn at high speed or attempting to brake or accelerate suddenly.

One of the most practical applications of rolling objects is the use of rolling-element bearings, such as ball bearings, in rotating devices. Made of metal, the rolling elements are usually encased between two rings that can rotate independently of each other. In most mechanisms, the inner ring is attached to a stationary shaft (or axle). Thus, while the inner ring is stationary, the outer ring is free to move with very little friction. This is the basis for which almost all motors (such as those found in ceiling fans, cars, drills, etc.) rely on to operate. Alternatively, the outer ring may be attached to a fixed support bracket, allowing the inner ring to support an axle, allowing for rotational freedom of an axle. The amount of friction on the mechanism's parts depends on the quality of the ball bearings and how much lubrication is in the mechanism.

Rolling objects are also frequently used as tools for transportation. One of the most basic ways is by placing a (usually flat) object on a series of lined-up rollers, or wheels.  The object on the wheels can be moved along them in a straight line, as long as the wheels are continuously replaced in the front (see history of bearings). This method of primitive transportation is efficient when no other machinery is available. Today, the most practical application of objects on wheels are cars, trains, and other human transportation vehicles.

Physics of simple rolling 

The simplest case of rolling is that of rolling without slipping along a flat surface with its axis parallel to the surface (or equivalently: perpendicular to the surface normal).

The trajectory of any point is a trochoid; in particular, the trajectory of any point in the object axis is a line, while the trajectory of any point in the object rim is a cycloid.

Thus, despite that rolling is different from rotation around a fixed axis, the instantaneous velocity of all particles of the rolling object is the same as if it was rotating around an axis that passes through the point of contact with the same angular velocity.

Any point in the rolling object farther from the axis than the point of contact will temporarily move opposite to the direction of the overall motion when it is below the level of the rolling surface (for example, any point in the part of the flange of a train wheel that is below the rail).

Energy 
Since kinetic energy is entirely a function of an object mass and velocity, the above result may be used with the parallel axis theorem to obtain the kinetic energy associated with simple rolling

Forces and acceleration 
Differentiating the relation between linear and angular velocity, with respect to time gives a formula relating linear and angular acceleration . Applying Newton's second law:

It follows that to accelerate the object, both a net force and a torque are required. When external force with no torque acts on the rolling object‐surface system, there will be a tangential force at the point of contact between the surface and rolling object that provides the required torque as long as the motion is pure rolling; this force is usually static friction, for example, between the road and a wheel or between a bowling lane and a bowling ball. When static friction isn't enough, the friction becomes dynamic friction and slipping happens. The tangential force is opposite in direction to the external force, and therefore partially cancels it. The resulting net force and acceleration are:

 has dimension of mass, and it is the mass that would have a rotational inertia  at distance  from an axis of rotation. Therefore, the term  may be thought of as the mass with linear inertia equivalent to the rolling object rotational inertia (around its center of mass). Since the work done by the external force is split between overcoming the translational and rotational inertia, the external force results in a smaller net force by the dimensionless multiplicative factor  where  represents the ratio of the aforesaid virtual mass to the object actual mass and it is equal to  where  is the radius of gyration corresponding to the object rotational inertia in pure rotation (not the rotational inertia in pure rolling). The square power is due to the fact rotational inertia of a point mass varies proportionally to the square of its distance to the axis.

In the specific case of an object rolling in an inclined plane which experiences only static friction, normal force and its own weight, (air drag is absent) the acceleration in the direction of rolling down the slope is:

 is specific to the object shape and mass distribution, it does not depend on scale or density. However, it will vary if the object is made to roll with different radiuses; for instance, it varies between a train wheel set rolling normally (by its tire), and by its axle. It follows that given a reference rolling object, another object bigger or with different density will roll with the same acceleration. This behavior is the same as that of an object in free fall or an object sliding without friction (instead of rolling) down an inclined plane.

Deformable Bodies 

When an axisymmetric deformable body contacts a surface, an interface is formed through which normal and shear forces may be transmitted. For example, a tire contacting the road carries the weight (normal load) of the car as well as any shear forces arising due to acceleration, braking or steering.  The deformations and motions in a steady rolling body can be efficiently characterized using an Eulerian description of rigid body rotation and a Lagrangian description of deformation. This approach greatly simplifies analysis by eliminating time-dependence, resulting in displacement, velocity, stress and strain fields that vary only spatially. Analysis procedures for finite element analysis of steady state rolling were first developed by Padovan, and are now featured in several commercial codes.

References

See also 

 Rolling resistance
 Frictional contact mechanics: Rolling contact
 Terrestrial locomotion in animals: Rolling
 Plantigrade
 Leg mechanism
 Tumbling (gymnastics)
 Roulette (curve)
 Trochoid
 Cycloid
 Gear 
 Rack and pinion

Rotation
Articles containing video clips